The four-line wrasse, Larabicus quadrilineatus, is a species of wrasse native to the Red Sea and the Gulf of Aden. Juveniles are cleaner fish, while the adults feed on coral polyps. This species is the only known member of its genus.

References

External links
 

Labridae
Monotypic fish genera
Fish described in 1835